The 1919–20 Kansas Jayhawks men's basketball team represented the University of Kansas during the 1919–20 college men's basketball season.

Roster
Roy Bennett
John Bunn
Marvin Harms
Arthur Lonborg
Howard Miller
Herbert Olson
George Rody
Ernst Uhrlaub

Schedule and results

References

Kansas Jayhawks men's basketball seasons
Kansas
Kansas Jayhawks Men's Basketball Team
Kansas Jayhawks Men's Basketball Team